Sir Robert Hyde Greg, KCMG (24 December 1876 – 3 December 1953) was a British diplomat. He was British Minister to Siam from 1921 to 1926 and British Minister to Romania from 1926 to 1929.

Gregg was also a noted collector of Egyptian antiquities. In his will he bequeathed his collection of 626 objects to the Fitzwilliam Museum, Cambridge. He also left a substantial part of his estate to the museum, but the monies were confiscated by the Egyptian government in the aftermath of the Suez Crisis. In 1964, compensation was paid, amounting to £33,515 17s 6d for the Fitzwilliam Museum, which formed the Greg Fund which exists to the present day.

Greg married the American heiress Julia Fairchild Schreiner in 1914.

References

External links 

 

1876 births
1953 deaths
Knights Commander of the Order of St Michael and St George
Ambassadors of the United Kingdom to Romania
Ambassadors of the United Kingdom to Thailand
British art collectors
British expatriates in Egypt
British Egyptologists